Model, Influencer, Doctor of Pharmacy.

Mahrou Ahmadi Kabir(born December 30,1998), popularly known as Mahrou Ahmadi, is an Iranian-Turkish model and a crowned beauty pageant. She was crowned Miss Earth Iran 2022 (The Worthy Lady). She was a finalist  representing Iran at the Miss Earth 2022 pageant in Manila, Philippines.

Early life and education

Miss Ahmadi was born and raised in Tehran, Iran by her motivational parents. After completing her schooling from Iran her parents encouraged her to continue higher education in Turkey. She pursued an associate degree in Herbal medical and medicines from University of Health Sciences in Istanbul, Turkey. She is currently a student of Doctor of Pharmacy at Istanbul University of health sciences.

Pageantry

Miss Iran 2022

On September 22, 2022, Miss Ahmadi was crowned  Winner at Miss Iran 2022.

Miss Earth Iran 2022 

On October 8, 2022, she represented Iran at the Miss Iran Earth 2022 pageant and was again crowned winner.

Miss Earth 2022

She was a finalist and only contestant representing Iran at the Miss Earth 2022.

Social media and platforms

Ahmadi is a popular Instagram influencer, model, YouTuber, blogger, and businesswoman. She is an avid supporter of producing and promoting herbal medical and beauty products.

References

External links 

 Mahrou Ahmadi on Instagram 
 Mahrou Ahmadi on Facebook
 Mahrou Ahmadi on YouTube

Iranian models
Beauty pageant winners
Living people